Melo is a genus of extremely large sea snails, marine gastropod molluscs in the family Volutidae, the volutes. Because of their huge ovate shells, these snails are often known as "bailers" (the shells were sometimes used for bailing out canoes) or "melons" (because the shell resembles that fruit).

Species in this genus sometimes produce large pearls. The image in the taxobox shows a group of these pearls with a shell of the species Melo melo.

Species
Species in the genus Melo include:
 Melo aethiopica (Linnaeus, 1758)  Crowned baler
 Melo amphora, (Lightfoot, 1786) Giant baler
 Melo ashmorensis Morrison, 2005
 Melo diadema
 Melo broderipii (Griffith, E. & E. Pidgeon, 1834)
 Melo georginae (Griffith, E. & E. Pidgeon, 1834)
 Melo melo (Lightfoot, 1786)  Indian volute
 Melo miltonis (Griffith, E. & E. Pidgeon, 1834)  Milton's melon or Southern bailer
 Melo nautica (Lamarck, 1822)
 Melo umbilicatus (Broderip in Sowerby, 1826) Heavy baler or umbilicate melon

Gallery

Ecology
Parasites of Melo sp. include trematode Lophotaspis macdonaldi.

References

 gastropods.com info

External links

Volutidae
Articles containing video clips
Gastropod genera
Taxa named by William Broderip